The Scarlet Runner is a 1916 American drama film serial directed by William P. S. Earle and Wally Van. The film is considered lost.

Plot
A series of 12 two-reel episodes, each a separate story related to the adventures of Christopher Race and his high-powered automobile, "The Scarlet Runner". Every episode has a different cast, except for the continuing role of Earle Williams.

Cast

 Earle Williams as Christopher Race
 Marguerite Blake as Lady Ivy
 L. Rogers Lytton as Baron von Hess
 Charles Kent as James Race
 Dorothy Kelly as Miss Collingwood
 Leila Blow as Mrs. Collingwood
 Donald Hall as Sir Gordon Race
 Lillian Tucker as Mrs. Dauray
 William R. Dunn as Fitzgerald
 Kalman Matus as Prince Mirco
 John Costello as Ambassador Rudovico
 Ethel Corcoran as Volda Rudovico
 Grace Valentine as Grace Norwood
 Zena Keefe as Sidney Chester / Dorothy Herbert
 Helen Pillsbury as The Mother
 Walter McGrail as Morley Chester
 Raymond Walburn as John Brown
 Gypsy O'Brien as Violet Hardcastle
 Hattie Delaro (as Hattie De Laro)

Chapter titles

 The Car and His Majesty
 The Nuremberg Watch
 The Masked Ball
 The Hidden Prince
 The Jacobean House
 The Mysterious Motor Car
 The Red Whiskered Man
 The Glove and the Ring
 The Gold Cigarette Case
 The Lost Girl
 The Missing Chapter
 The Car and the Girl

See also
 List of film serials
 List of film serials by studio

References

External links

1916 films
1916 drama films
1916 lost films
American auto racing films
Silent American drama films
American silent serial films
American black-and-white films
Lost American films
Vitagraph Studios film serials
Films directed by William P. S. Earle
Films based on works by Alice Williamson
Films about automobiles
Lost drama films
Films with screenplays by George H. Plympton
1910s American films